Tatamibari is a type of logic puzzle designed and published by Nikoli. The puzzle is based on Japanese tatami mats.

Rules
A Tatamibari puzzle is played on a rectangular grid with three different kinds of symbols in it: +, -. and |. The solver must partition the grid into rectangular or square regions according to the following rules:

 Every partition must contain exactly one symbol in it.
 A + symbol must be contained in a square.
 A | symbol must be contained in a rectangle with a greater height than width.
 A - symbol must be contained in a rectangle with a greater width than height.
 Four pieces may never share the same corner.

Computational Complexity

The problem of finding a solution to a particular Tatamibari configuration is NP-complete.

See also
 List of Nikoli puzzle types

References

Logic puzzles